Dovre Station is a railway station located at the village of Dovre Dovre, Norway. The station is located on the Dovre Line and served by one daily express trains in each direction to Oslo and Trondheim since 11 June 2006. The station was opened in 1913 when the Dovre Line was extended from Otta to Dombås.

References

Railway stations in Oppland
Railway stations on the Dovre Line
Railway stations opened in 1913
1913 establishments in Norway
Dovre